The following is a list of FCC-licensed radio stations in the U.S. state of Arizona, which can be sorted by their call signs, frequencies, cities of license, licensees, and programming formats.

List of radio stations

Defunct
 KAKA
 KCKY (1948-1960)
 KCLF
 KCLS
 KCMA-LP
 KDAP
 KEVT
 KFAS
 KFBR
 KFTT
 KGLU
 KIKX
 KJKJ
 KNOG-AM
 KSGC
 KSOM
 KSUN
 KTPM
 KUMA
 KVNC
 KWFM
 KWJB
 KZOW

References

 
Arizona
Radio stations